Dr. H. D. Lucas House was a historic home located at Black Creek, Wilson County, North Carolina.  It consisted of two sections: a one-story Greek Revival style doctor's office built about 1850, and a late-19th century, Victorian cottage dated to the early 1880s, which served as Dr. Lucas' residence. The cottage was a one-story, three-bay, single-pile frame dwelling with a steeply pitched gable roof. The house has been demolished.

It was listed on the National Register of Historic Places in 1986.

References

Houses on the National Register of Historic Places in North Carolina
Victorian architecture in North Carolina
Greek Revival houses in North Carolina
Houses completed in 1850
Houses in Wilson County, North Carolina
National Register of Historic Places in Wilson County, North Carolina